Ritte may refer to:

Ritte Cycles, an American bicycle manufacturer
Řetůvka (German: Ritte), a village and municipality in the Pardubice Region of the Czech Republic
Philip Ritte, a British tenor (1871-1954)
Walter Ritte, a Native Hawaiian activist and educator (born 1945)